The Capitol Theatre is a historic theatre located in the village of Port Chester, Westchester County, New York. It was designed by noted theater architect Thomas W. Lamb (1871–1942) and built in 1926.  The 1,800-seat facility operates as a concert venue, hosting musicians and occasionally comedians, as owned and operated by NYC-based concert promoter Peter Shapiro.  The Capitol Theatre has had a long history, with tenures as a movie theater and catering hall, in addition to hosting concerts.

Building Structure
It consists of two parts: a three-story section containing three storefronts, the theater entrance, two stories of office space; and the theater auditorium.  The front section is nine bays wide and four bays deep with a truncated hipped roof.  It features a decorative terra cotta cornice.  The theater structure is irregular in shape and ranges from four to seven stories in height.

History

Movie theatre
The Capitol Theatre was built for vaudeville and cinema and continued as a movie theater until 1970. Its opening night in 1926 sold out all 2,000 seats and had to turn hundreds away.

Concert venue
In the 1970s, the theatre was renovated for use as a performance space. The Capitol was utilized as a concert space throughout the 1970s, 1980s and 1990s, and featured performances by such acts as Pink Floyd, Johnny Winter, Rick Derringer, the Talking Heads, the Grateful Dead, Rubén Blades, Janis Joplin, Parliament-Funkadelic and Traffic. The Grateful Dead played 13 dates at the Capitol Theatre in a one-year span from 1970 to 1971. American Songwriter notes that "Many fans think those shows were some of the best the band ever played." Janis Joplin debuted her song "Mercedes Benz" at the theater, to the surprise of her band, after writing it at a bar nearby.
In 1984, the Capitol Theatre was added to the National Register of Historic Places. In the 1980s, the frequency of live events at the theatre diminished, partially due to a village curfew for live music after 1:00 am. The Capitol would host off-Broadway plays and musicals, and events run by the Port Chester Council of the Arts. The 1990s would see some live music again, with the likes of Phish, Blues Traveler, Spin Doctors and Strangefolk. Both David Bowie and the Rolling Stones performed at the Capitol in 1997, as part of episodes of the MTV television program Live From The 10 Spot. The venue also hosted the Complete Last Waltz around Thanksgiving for several years.

Catering hall
The theatre later became a catering and special-events facility, run by owner Marvin Ravikoff and managed under the leadership of Jim Lopolito. The lower level seats were removed to create a flat space for tables and a dance floor for weddings, Bar Mitzvot and other events.

Reopening as concert venue
In December 2011, The New York Times announced that the theatre was to be reopened by music entrepreneur Peter Shapiro, owner of the Brooklyn Bowl and former owner of the NYC club Wetlands Preserve, to present major concerts at the venue, in partnership with concert promoter The Bowery Presents. A multimillion-dollar renovation took place; "state-of-the-art" sound and lighting equipment was installed. Part of the renovations included acquiring the adjacent Capitol Jewelers store and converting it into a bar, which is open to the public most nights when the theatre does not have an event. The bar, with the approval of the estate of the Garcia family, was named "Garcia's" in honor of Grateful Dead guitarist Jerry Garcia. The Capitol Theatre reopened on September 4, 2012, with Bob Dylan as its first act. Initially, Shapiro had a long-term lease on the Capitol Theatre, which, at the time, was owned by Marvin Ravikoff. In December 2012, Shapiro purchased the theatre. The theatre has hosted many famous performers and top acts such as B.B. King, Furthur, Willie Nelson, the Black Crowes, Skrillex, George Lopez, Elvis Costello & The Roots, Steely Dan, Al Green, the B-52s, and Yo Gabba Gabba!.

In 2013 the venue hosted Dawes, Blondie, Pat Benatar, Billy Idol, the Rascals, and Chicago, and scheduled Neil Young, Willie Nelson, Chris Isaak, Yes, Foreigner, Patti Smith, Courtney Love, Bonnie Raitt, Jonny Lang, Cyndi Lauper, Herbie Hancock and many other top performers.

On November 3, 2013, The New York Times reported that Phil Lesh, longtime bass player of the Grateful Dead, would play 45 shows with Shapiro of which 30 would take place at the Capitol Theatre and the first at Brooklyn Bowl on November 14, 2013. Since Lesh's retirement from touring in 2014 he has performed multiple residencies each year at the Capitol Theatre in addition to performing other shows at his own venue, Terrapin Crossroads in San Rafael, California, and occasionally other venues, often ones owned by Shapiro.

On December 11, 2015, Bo Burnham's stand-up special Make Happy was filmed at the Capitol Theatre and released on Netflix the following year.

1990s Folk Rock band Counting Crows played a special show at the Capitol Theatre where super fans Mike and Melissa (known to the band as the S&M couple) would get engaged.

See also
National Register of Historic Places listings in southern Westchester County, New York

References

External links
New York Times article
Capitol Theatre website
Cinema Treasures: Capitol Theatre, Port Chester, NY

Theatres on the National Register of Historic Places in New York (state)
Theatres completed in 1926
Buildings and structures in Westchester County, New York
Port Chester, New York
1926 establishments in New York (state)
Tourist attractions in Westchester County, New York
National Register of Historic Places in Westchester County, New York
Thomas W. Lamb buildings